Z3 may refer to:

Mobile phones
 BlackBerry Z3, a smartphone
 Moto Z3, a smartphone
 Motorola Rizr Z3, a slide mobile phone
 Samsung Z3, a smartphone
 Sony Xperia Z3, a smartphone

Computing
 Z3 (computer), the world's first working programmable, fully automatic digital computer created by Konrad Zuse
 Z3 Theorem Prover, a satisfiability modulo theories solver by Microsoft
 .Z3, a file extension for story files for the Infocom Z-machine

Vehicles
 BMW Z3, a BMW sports car model
 German destroyer Z3 Max Schultz, a Nazi Germany destroyer
 Z-3, American Blimp MZ-3 of the U.S. Navy

Other uses
 Zenon: Z3, a television series
 Z3, the cyclic group of order 3
 Zombies 3, a 2022 Disney Channel television film

See also

 3Z (disambiguation)
 Z33 (disambiguation)
 Z333 (disambiguation)
 ZE (disambiguation)